Rokdim Im Kokhavim 7 is the 7th season of the popular reality TV show Rokdim Im Kokhavim. It is hosted by Guy Zu-Aretz and Yarden Harel with judges Eli Mizrahi and the Newest Uri Paster and Michal Amdurski.

Couples

Scores 

Red numbers indicate the lowest score for each week.
Green numbers indicate the highest score for each week.
W indicates the winners of dance duels in Week 6.
L indicates the losers of dance duels in Week 6.
 indicates the couple eliminated that week.
 indicates the returning couple that finished in the bottom two.
 indicates the winning couple.
 indicates the runner-up couple.
 indicates the third-place couple.
 indicates the couple that withdrew from the competition.

Averages 
This table only counts for dances scored on a traditional 30-points scale (the scores for the Hustle group dance in Week 5 are not included).

Couples' highest and lowest scoring dances

According to the traditional 30-point scale:

Highest and lowest scoring performances 
The best and worst performances in each dance according to the judges' 30-point scale are as follows:

Weekly scores and songs

Unless indicated otherwise, individual judges scores in the charts below (given in parentheses) are listed in this order from left to right: Uri Paster, Michal Amdurski, Eli Mizrahi.

Week 1

Night 1

Night 2

Week 2: Most Memorable Year / Personal Story Week

Night 1

Night 2

Week 3

Night 1: Sixties Night / The Beatles Special

Night 2: Classical Night / Opera Special

Week 4

Night 1

Night 2

Week 5: Solo Week
Note: Every individual routine must contain a solo part performed by the celebrity. All couples then go on to perform a group routine. Every judge awards 5 points bonus to their favorite couple.

Night 1

Night 2

Week 6: Duel Week
Note: The couples were randomly divided into four teams, each consisting of two couples. Every team performed an unlearned dance. Instead of scoring, the judges picked the better of two couples in every performance. The winners were safe for next week, while the losers had to perform another routine, which they had not done before.

Duel Part

Individual Part

Week 7: Then & Now Special 
Note: The remaining couples were divided into two teams. The first team, called Team "Then", danced to Israeli music from the 1970s, while the second team, Team "Now" had contemporary Israeli songs for their dances. After an individual round, each team performed a group routine. In both teams, the group routine score was added to scores from the individual round giving a combined team score out of 120. Members of the team with a higher overall score were safe for next week, while the losing team saw two of its three couples eliminated.

Team "Then" were proclaimed the winners with 102 points out of 120. The losing team, Team "Now" collected 97 points. All of Team "Then" couples were safe. Two couples from Team "Now" were eliminated based on combined individual dance scores and viewers' votes.

Week 8: Instant Choreography Week 
Note: All couples performed an Instant Jive, which means the song they had to dance to was revealed to them just 30 minutes before the performance.
Individual judges scores in the charts below (given in parentheses) are listed in this order from left to right: Uri Paster, Michal Amdurski, Claude Dadia.

Week 9: Finals Week 
Note: The three final couples performed their Week 1 dance again. Judges' scores were combined with viewers' votes and the lowest scoring couple was eliminated. The top 2 couples went on to perform their final dance, a Freestyle.

Dance Chart

 Highest scoring dance
 Lowest scoring dance
 Performed, but not scored
 Not performed due to withdrawal

External links
 Official site

Channel 2 (Israeli TV channel) original programming
Season 07